Frank Harcourt Slade (29 June 1915 – 13 August 1960) was an Australian rules footballer who played with Collingwood in the Victorian Football League (VFL).

References

External links 

Frank Slade's profile at Collingwood Forever

1915 births
1960 deaths
Australian rules footballers from Victoria (Australia)
Collingwood Football Club players